Ecopark is an urban township development on the outskirts of Hanoi, in Hung Yen Province, Vietnam. Currently under development, Ecopark will span 500 ha with an estimated investment capital of over US$8.2 billion. The entire development, divided into nine construction phases, is expected to complete in an 18-year period.

Development 

Ecopark is developed by Viet Hung Urban Development and Investment J.S.C (VIHAJICO), a joint venture of the following Vietnamese companies:
 AA Construction Architecture Joint Stock Company (AA Corporation)
 ATA Architects Co., Ltd
 Nam Thanh Do Construction Consultants J.S.C
 Thanh Nam Construction and Investment J.S.C
 Duy Nghia Co., Ltd
 Phung Thien Trading Co., Ltd
 Nam Thanh Tourism and Commerce J.S.C
 Bao Tin Trading Co., Ltd.

Opposition from local farmers 
The project has met resistance from about 2000 farmers whose land was repossessed, as in Vietnam all land belongs to the state.

There were protests in 2006 and 2006.  Then on April 24, 2012, this became one of the biggest land confrontation in Vietnam, with 1000 police facing farmers armed with sticks, rocks and Molotov cocktails. Police fired teargas into the crowds, arrested several protesters, and some villagers were beaten by the police with clubs.

A farmer said "she was initially offered the equivalent of $2.63 per square meter, with the price rising three times to $7.18", while "apartments to be built at Ecopark were offered at a minimum $886 per square meter in a promotion for early buyers in May last year"

References

External links 
 Official website of Ecopark Vietnam

Hưng Yên province